Kieffer Bellows (born June 10, 1998) is an American professional ice hockey forward for the  Philadelphia Flyers of the National Hockey League (NHL). He was drafted in the first round (19th overall) of the 2016 NHL Entry Draft by the New York Islanders. He is the son of former NHL player Brian Bellows.

Playing career
Bellows grew up playing hockey in Edina, Minnesota where he won a Minnesota 2014 Class 2A State Championship as a sophomore at Edina High School.
Before being drafted into the NHL, he played with the  Sioux Falls Stampede and U.S. National Development Team of the United States Hockey League (USHL). In his rookie season with the Stampede, Bellows was fifth in the United States Hockey League with 33 goals and was named USHL Rookie of the Year. Bellows then went on to play with Boston University before being drafted in the first round of the 2016 NHL Entry Draft by the New York Islanders.  On September 22, 2017, Bellows was signed to a three-year, entry-level contract with the Islanders. Bellows chose to forgo the three remaining years of his NCAA eligibility and subsequently joined the Portland Winterhawks of the Western Hockey League (WHL), who has drafted him in the 2013 WHL Bantam Draft.

Bellows made his NHL debut on February 4, 2020, in the Islander's 4–3 overtime win against the Dallas Stars and also recorded his first NHL point when he assisted on Derick Brassard's goal. Bellows scored his two NHL goals in the Islanders' 5–3 win against the Los Angeles Kings on February 6.

On October 9, 2020, the American Hockey League (AHL) announced that Bellows had violated the league's performance enhancing substances rules. On March 13, 2021, Bellows became the first player in Islanders history to score his first four NHL goals in a pair of two-goal games.

In September 2021 and August 2022, Bellows was signed to one-year contracts by the Islanders. Bellows opened the  season with the Islanders, featuring on opening night before serving as a healthy scratch through 6 games before he was placed on waivers by the Islanders. Bellows was claimed off waivers the following day by the Philadelphia Flyers on October 27, 2022.

Personal life
He is the son of former NHL player Brian Bellows.

Career statistics

Regular season and playoffs

International

References

External links
 

1998 births
Living people
American men's ice hockey left wingers
Boston University Terriers men's ice hockey players
Bridgeport Sound Tigers players
Ice hockey players from Minnesota
Lehigh Valley Phantoms players
National Hockey League first-round draft picks
New York Islanders draft picks
New York Islanders players
Philadelphia Flyers players
Portland Winterhawks players
Sioux Falls Stampede players
Sportspeople from Edina, Minnesota
USA Hockey National Team Development Program players